Route 140 or Highway 140 may refer to:

Australia
 Hamilton Highway

Canada
 New Brunswick Route 140
 Ontario Highway 140
 Prince Edward Island Route 140

Costa Rica
 National Route 140

Germany
 Bundesautobahn 140

India
 National Highway 140 (India)

Japan
 Japan National Route 140
 Fukuoka Prefectural Route 140
 Nara Prefectural Route 140

Malaysia
 Malaysia Federal Route 140

United States
 Interstate 140 (two current highways)
 U.S. Route 140 (former)
 Alabama State Route 140
 Arkansas Highway 140
 California State Route 140
 Colorado State Highway 140
 Connecticut Route 140
Florida State Road 140 (pre-1945) (former)
Florida State Road 140A (pre-1945) (former)
 County Road 140 (Madison County, Florida)
 Georgia State Route 140
 Illinois Route 140
 Indiana State Road 140
 Iowa Highway 140
 K-140 (Kansas highway)
 Kentucky Route 140
 Louisiana Highway 140
 Maine State Route 140
 Maryland Route 140
 Massachusetts Route 140
 M-140 (Michigan highway)
Missouri Route 140 (former)
 Nevada State Route 140
 New Hampshire Route 140
 New Jersey Route 140
 New Mexico State Road 140
 New York State Route 140
 County Route 140 (Broome County, New York)
 County Route 140 (Erie County, New York)
 County Route 140 (Fulton County, New York)
 County Route 140 (Montgomery County, New York)
 County Route 140 (Niagara County, New York)
 County Route 140 (Onondaga County, New York)
 County Route 140 (Rensselaer County, New York)
 County Route 140 (Wayne County, New York)
 North Carolina Highway 140
 Ohio State Route 140
 Oregon Route 140
 Tennessee State Route 140
 Texas State Highway 140
 Texas State Highway Loop 140 (former)
 Texas State Highway Spur 140
 Farm to Market Road 140
 Utah State Route 140
 Utah State Route 140 (pre-1969) (former)
 Vermont Route 140
 Virginia State Route 140
 Virginia State Route 140 (pre-1933) (former)
 Virginia State Route 140 (1933-1949) (former)
 Washington State Route 140 (former)
 West Virginia Route 140
 Wisconsin Highway 140

Territories
 Puerto Rico Highway 140